Koraleigh is a small village in the west of the Riverina region of New South Wales, Australia. The village is on the Murray River and in Murray River Council local government area.

Koraleigh is on the traditional lands of the Muthi Muthi Aboriginal tribe and it is from their language that it gets its name.

At the 2006 census, Koraleigh had a population of 373.

Koraleigh Post Office opened on 18 September 1922. In the late 1980s, the Post Office moved from its original location in Eagles Lane and was integrated into the town's only store.

Gallery

References

External links

Towns in New South Wales
Towns in the Riverina
Murray River Council